Molly Sinclair Urquhart (6 January 1906 – 6 October 1977) was a Scottish actress and theater director.

Early life 
Urquhart was born in Glasgow as Mary Sinclair Urquhart. She was the daughter of post office clerk Ann McCallum and sea-going engineer William Urquhart. She grew up in the West End of Glasgow where she attended Downhill Primary School and Church Street School. After school, she worked in a shop and took the exam to work for the GPO.

She had no formal training in theater, coming to the profession through the "amateur movement". While a teenager in the late 1920s, she joined the St. George Players, an amateur club. In 1931, she became a member of the Tron Theatre Club in Glasgow, followed by Glasgow's Curtain Theatre in 1932. She adopted the name Molly Urquhart for her stage name.

Career

Theater 
In 1932, Urquhart joined the Howard and Wyndham company, becoming a professional actress. Her first professional role was in the melodrama Jeannie Deans at Theatre Royal, Glasgow in 1934. She then moved to repertory theater in England and Scotland, including joining the Sheldon-Browne Company in 1936 and the company of the Festival Theatre, Cambridge.

During World War II, she set up and ran her own repertory theater company, the Molly S. Urquhart Theatre or MSU Theatre (now known as the Rutherglen Repertory Theatre) in a former church on East Main Street in Rutherglen, Scotland in 1939. Urquhart not only acted, but also directed plays and managed the MSU Theatre. The company included Eileen Herlie, Gordon Jackson, Duncan Macrae, and Nicholas Parsons. Their first show was Merton Hodge's The Wind and the Rain which opened on 2 May 1939.

In 1944, MSU Theatre closed; Urquhart and others from the company joined the newly established Citizens Theatre in Glasgow. She remained with the Citizens until 1956, performing in plays such as James Bridie's The Forrigan Reel and The Tintock Cup.

In 1945 when The Forrigan Reel toured, she had her first performance in London at Sadlers Wells Theatre. Her "greatest triumph" was said to be at the Edinburgh Festival of 1948 where she played Dame Sensualite in Tyrone Guthrie's production of A Satire of the Three Estates at the Assembly Hall. She appeared in London's West End in Eric Linklater's plays Love in Albania in 1949 and The Mortimer Touch in 1952. In 1953, she joined the Five Past Eight Show which was based at Alhambra Theatre in Glasgow; the show ran throughout the 1950s. Her portrayal of Bessie Burgess in West End revival of The Plough and the Stars in 1962 was "a notable hit".

Film and television 
Urquhart's first film role was in the 1955 comedy Geordie with Alastair Sim under the direction of Fred Zinnerman. This was the beginning of numerous films that Urquhart made with Zinnerman; others included as Geordie (1955), The Nun's Story (1959), The Sundowners (1960), and A Man For All Seasons (1966). She also had roles in the films Floodtide (1949), Portrait of Clare (1950), and Blonde Sinner (1956).

She had a role in the BBC television series Doctor Finlay's Casebook and the made-for-television film The Little Minister in 1950.

Honors and legacy 

 A dramatized version of her life was performed by Dumbarton People's Theatre.
 Helen Murdoch wrote a biography of Urquhart entitled Travelling Hopefully: The Story of Molly Urquhart. 
 Her papers are stored at the University of Glasgow Special Collections.

Personal life 
In August 1934, she married William MacIntosh (1900-1959), a police officer. In 1949, he became the first manager of the Citizens Theatre when it was located at Gorbals. The couple had one son, James Urquhart McIntosh, in 1943. They lived in Ibrox, Glasgow.

She died in 1977 at the age of 71 in Glasgow.

Partial filmography

References

External links 

 Molly Urquhart in IMDb

1906 births
1977 deaths
Actresses from Glasgow
Scottish television actresses
Scottish film actresses
Scottish stage actresses
20th-century Scottish actresses
Rutherglen
Scottish theatre directors